Tommaso Michele Francesco Saverio Traetta (30 March 1727 – 6 April 1779) was an Italian composer of the Neapolitan School. Along with other composers mainly in the Holy Roman Empire and France, he was responsible for certain operatic reforms including reducing ornateness of style and the primacy of star singers.

Biography 
Traetta was born in Bitonto, a town near Bari in the Apulia region, in Italy. He eventually became a pupil of the composer, singer and teacher Nicola Porpora in Naples, and scored a first success with his opera Il Farnace in Naples in 1751. Around this time, he came into contact with Niccolò Jommelli. From here on in, Traetta seems to have had regular commissions from all around the country, running the gamut of the usual classical subjects. Then in 1759, something untoward happened that was to trigger Traetta's first operatic re-think. He accepted a post as court composer at Parma.

Parma, it has to be said, was hardly an important place in the grand scheme of things: a minor dukedom, but a dukedom with a difference, because the incumbent was Spanish, and his wife was French. Parma had regularly changed owners between Austrians and Spaniards, and the current Duke was the Infante Felipe. And in one of those inter-dynastic marriages which so complicate the history of Europe. He had married the eldest daughter of Louis XV. There was currently in Parma a craze for all things French, and in particular a fixation with the splendour of Versailles. Which is where the influence of the composer Jean-Philippe Rameau comes in. It was in Parma that Traetta's operas first moved in new directions. As a result, Antigona, his 1772 opera for Saint Petersburg, was amongst his most forward-looking, the closest he approached the famous reform ideals usually associated with Gluck, but in fact a current that was felt by several other composers of the time.

It was at the court of the duke of Bourbon-Parma, that Traetta ran unexpectedly headlong into some fresh air from France. In Parma in 1759, he found several noteworthy collaborators, and he was fortunate in finding that the man in charge of opera there was a highly cultivated Paris-trained Frenchman, Guillaume du Tillot, who had the complete cultural portfolio among all his other responsibilities as Don Felipe's First Minister. To judge from the general stylistic influence in terms of grand scenic effects, and from some specific musical borrowings, Traetta had access in Parma to copies and reports of Rameau's operas. To their influence, Traetta added some ingredients of his own, especially a feeling for dramatic colour, in the shape of his melodies and his use of the orchestra. The result was a combination of Italian, French and German elements, which even expect the Sturm und Drang movement that was to flourish a few years later, further North.

The first fruit of this Francophilia was the opera Traetta wrote in 1759. Ippolito ed Aricia owes a lot to Rameau's great tragédie lyrique of 1733, Hippolyte et Aricie. But Traetta's is no mere translation of Rameau. Carlo Innocenzo Frugoni, Traetta's librettist in Parma, completely reworked the original French version by abbé Pellegrin, which itself had been based on Racine, in its turn stemming ultimately from ancient Greek roots–the Hippolytus of Euripides. Frugoni kept certain key French elements: the five-act structure as against the customary three; the occasional opportunities for French-style spectacle and effects and, in particular, the dances and divertissements that end each of those five acts; and a more elaborate use of the chorus than, for instance, in Hasse and Graun and Jommelli.

Through the following decade, the 1760s, Tommaso Traetta composed music (including opera seria) unceasingly. There was a clutch of comedies as well, and sacred music composed to imperial order. For Traetta served from 1768 to 1775 as music director for Catherine the Great of Russia, to which he moved. Still, opera seria was what her imperial majesty commanded. Traetta's first operas for Catherine the Great seem to have been largely revivals and revisions of his earlier works. In 1772 came Antigona, which reached areas of expression he had not explored before.

The Court Opera of Catherine the Great performed in a theatre inside the Winter Palace itself, created by the Italian architect Francesco Bartolomeo Rastrelli, who was the architect of many buildings in Saint Petersburg, including the Hermitage. The theatre was quite close to the Empress's own apartments. Too close, in fact, because in 1783 some time after Traetta's departure, she ordered it to be closed and a new one built. Some years before that, she had already booted out Rastrelli, who had been the favourite architect of her predecessor. Traetta too was to depart, though possibly it was the harsh climate of Peter the Great's still relatively new and very damp capital, rather than the Empress' boot, that led him to leave Saint Petersburg in 1775, and resume the opera composer's peripatetic life, even writing two works for London: Germondo in 1776 and Telemaco the year after. There is a story, told by the Traetta Association in Bitonto, that he left Saint Petersburg under threat of assassination by the empress—it seems he was enraged that she insisted on a happy ending for Antigona, and in revenge put music for Polish independence into the final chaconne. He left in time, but his librettist was poisoned.

Traetta died two years later, in April of 1779, in Venice. He married shortly before he died, and had a son, Filippo Traetta, who in 1800 moved to America and became a fairly successful composer.

Operas

Bibliography 
 Stabat Mater (Naples) vocal score, Idea Press, Port St. Lucie, 2017, 
 Miserere, vocal score, Idea Press, Port St. Lucie, 2015, 
 Il Cavaliere Errante, vocal score, Idea Press, Port St. Lucie, 2015, 
 Messa in Do, vocal score, Idea Press, Port St. Lucie, 2014, 
 Stabat Mater (Munich), Idea Press, Port St. Lucie, 2015, 

 See also 
 Traetta Prize

References

Further reading
 Marco Russo, Tommaso Traetta: i Libretti della Riforma – Parma 1759–61, Facoltà di Lettere di Trento, Trento 2005
 Marco Russo, Tommaso Traetta: Maestro di cappella napoletano, Edizioni S. Marco dei Giustiniani, Genova 2006
 Fabrizio Cassoni, Gianfranco Spada, Le Feste d'Imeneo, Tommaso Traetta a Parma, Traettiana, London 2010
 Susanne Dunlap, Armida – Traetta, Salieri and Righini in Vienna'', Traettiana, London 2011

External links

Operone list of Traetta operas

Traetta.com website

1727 births
1779 deaths
18th-century Italian male musicians
Italian Classical-period composers
Neapolitan school composers
18th-century Italian composers
Italian classical composers
Italian male classical composers
Italian opera composers
Male opera composers
People from Bitonto